TixTrack, Inc. is a provider of ticket software solutions started in 2008 and based in Los Angeles, California in the United States. TixTrack's products aim to help ticket sellers increase their ticket sales by providing visual seat level reporting and analysis tools as well as guidance on Dynamic Pricing.

TixTrack's software can work standalone or in conjunction with other ticketing systems, including software from Veritix and Patron Technology.

TixTrack has three types of clients: venues, promoters, and sports teams and is used by more than 100 venues throughout North America.

TixTrack has been issued United States patents for its technology such as venue and inventory visualization, pricing strategy tools and predictive pricing algorithms.

References

Companies based in Santa Monica, California
Ticket sales companies